The Mysteries of Paris (French: Les mystères de Paris, Italian: I misteri di Parigi) is a 1957 French-Italian drama film directed by Fernando Cerchio and starring Frank Villard, Yvette Lebon and Jacques Castelot. It is based on the 1842 novel The Mysteries of Paris by Eugène Sue, one of a number of film adaptations of the work.

Cast

References

Bibliography 
 Chiti, Roberto & Poppi, Roberto. Dizionario del cinema italiano: Dal 1945 al 1959. Gremese Editore, 1991.
 Goble, Alan. The Complete Index to Literary Sources in Film. Walter de Gruyter, 1999.

External links 
 
 The Mysteries of Paris at Variety Distribution

1957 films
French drama films
Italian drama films
1957 drama films
1950s Italian-language films
Films directed by Fernando Cerchio
Films set in Paris
Films based on French novels
1950s Italian films
1950s French films